Rebecca (レベッカ) was a Japanese rock band that had a great deal of success throughout the 1980s, fronted by singer Nokko. The band's 1985 album "Rebecca IV ~maybe tomorrow~" sold one million copies in the year, surpassing Yuming, the first truly commercially successful rock album in Japan. They won the Japan Gold Disc Award for Japanese artists in 1988. Rebecca disbanded in 1991.

Discography 
Voice Print 1984 
Nothing To Lose 1984 
Wild & Honey 1985
Rebecca IV ~maybe tomorrow~ 1985
Time 1986
Poison 1987
Blond Saurus 1989

References

Japanese pop rock music groups
Japanese rock music groups